Brian Dawe may refer to:
Bryan Dawe (born 1948), Australian writer, comedian, political satirist, songwriter, photographer and social activist
Bing Dawe (born 1952), New Zealand artist and sculptor